Two ships of the Royal Navy have borne the name HMS Oak, after the tree, the oak:

 was a former Dutch ship captured in 1652, and added to the Commonwealth of England Navy. She was burnt by a fireship in July 1653 in action with the Dutch.
 was  launched in 1912. She was sold in 1921 and was broken up the following year.

See also

Note that the early ships named HMS Royal Oak were often mentioned in records with the word "Royal" omitted.

Royal Navy ship names